Sant Cugat is Catalan for Saint Cucuphas and may refer to:
Sant Cugat del Vallès, Spain
Sant Cugat Museum
Sant Cugat (Barcelona–Vallès Line), a railway station
Sant Cugat Sesgarrigues, Spain